Manika Assembly constituency is an assembly constituency in the Indian state of Jharkhand. It was previously in Latehar Assembly constituency. In 1977 it was partitioned forming new 'Manika (Vidhan Sabha Constituency)'.

And after partition from Bihar, new state Jharkhand came into existence on 15 November 2000 and Manika Vidhansabha came under Jharkhand.

Members of Legislative Assembly
1977: Yamuna Singh, Bharatiya Janata Party
1980: Yamuna Singh, Bharatiya Janata Party
1985: Yamuna Singh, Bharatiya Janata Party
1990: Yamuna Singh, Bharatiya Janata Party
1995:  Ramchandra Singh, Rashtriya Janata Dal
2000: Yamuna Singh, Bharatiya Janata Party
Jharkhand

Election Results

2019

See also
Vidhan Sabha
List of states of India by type of legislature

References

Assembly constituencies of Jharkhand